Sir Eric James Neal,  (born 3 June 1924) is an Australian retired businessman and public officer. He is a former Commissioner of Sydney (1987–1988), Governor of South Australia (1996–2001) and Chancellor of Flinders University (2002–2010).

Career
Neal trained as an engineer at the South Australian School of Mines (now part of the University of South Australia), and became a successful businessman. The peak of his career was fourteen years as CEO of Boral. He was also a Director of John Fairfax Holdings, BHP, Coca-Cola Amatil and AMP and Chairperson of Westpac and Atlas Copco Australia.

In 1984, Neal was listed as one of Australia's 125 best remunerated business executives by Australian Business magazine. In 1992, journalist Andrew Cornell described him as a "tough, frequently autocratic businessman." Not withstanding, he oversaw 14 years of consecutive and rising profits for shareholders and history has shown that his views and decisions made whilst on the Westpac Board were correct.

Neal has chaired various government advisory bodies and served as National Chairman, Duke of Edinburgh's Award (1984–92), President of the Order of Australia Association (1989–92), Chair of the Opera Foundation (1990–96). He was Chief Commissioner of the City of Sydney (1987–88) and a member of the Senate of the University of Sydney.

Neal was appointed Governor of South Australia in 1996, and became the first person from the business community to take up residence in Government House, Adelaide. He held the position until 2001, after which he served as Chancellor of Flinders University from 2002 until 2010.

Defence sector
Neal is a former Honorary Air Commodore of the City of Adelaide Squadron of the Royal Australian Air Force and Honorary Colonel of the Royal South Australia Regiment. He is also an honorary life member of the Returned & Services League of Australia.

In 1981, Neal was appointed to a committee tasked with reviewing Australia's Higher Defence Organisation. In 1992 he was awarded the United States Department of Defence Medal for Distinguished Public Service for his contribution in Chairing the Council that organised Australian events commemorating the 50th Anniversary of the Battle of the Coral Sea.

In 2009 Neal commenced his final role in public office, serving as Chair of the Veterans Advisory Council in South Australia. This culminated in the opening of the Memorial Walk in Kintore Avenue. Neal retired from the position in 2016, concluding 76 years in private and public sector employment.

Community
Neal was appointed (1984–1992) as National Chair of the Duke of Edinburgh's International Award – Australia and as an International Trustee of the Award from 1987–1997. He and his wife, Lady Joan Neal AM were World Fellows of The Duke of Edinburgh’s Award International Association.

Honours
He is a Life Fellow of the Australian Institute of Company Directors
He is one of only nine Honorary Fellows of the Australian Institute of Building
The Sir Eric Neal Library at the University of South Australia was opened in his honour in 2001.
A caricature of Eric Neal was donated to the National Portrait Gallery by the artist, Joe Greenberg, in 2001.
Flinders University named its Engineering Building after him.
On 17 April 2007, Sir Eric Neal accepted the offer of the Adelaide University Soccer Club Blacks invitation to become the club's patron.
 First Principal Patron of the Freemasons Foundation Centre for Men's Health at the University of Adelaide.
 Honorary doctorates from the University of Sydney, University of South Australia (1996) and Flinders University.
 Patron of the Port Adelaide Football Club.
 Gold Distinguished Service Medal, The Duke of Edinburgh's International Award – Australia (2016)

Personal life 
Neal was born in London, England and migrated with his family to Adelaide in February 1927. He became engaged to Joan Bowden in 1949, they were married at St Peter's Church, Glenelg in 1950 and their first son was born in 1951 in Broken Hill. A second son was born in 1963 in Ballarat. Lady Thelma 'Joan' Neal AM DstJ died in Adelaide on 28 February 2023.

Neal played football with the Adelaide University Soccer Club from 1946–49 and eventually became the club's patron.

References

1924 births
Living people
Governors of South Australia
People from South Australia
Westpac people
Australian Commanders of the Royal Victorian Order
Companions of the Order of Australia
Australian Knights Bachelor
Recipients of the Centenary Medal
Fellows of the Australian Academy of Technological Sciences and Engineering
Chancellors of Flinders University
Fellows of the Australian Institute of Company Directors
Councillors of Sydney County Council